Qismət Qardaşxan oğlu Alıyev (born on 24 October 1996) is an Azerbaijani professional footballer who plays as a midfielder for Zira in the Azerbaijan Premier League.

Career

Club
On 28 May 2015, Alıyev made his debut in the Azerbaijan Premier League for Gabala match against Baku.

On 5 October 2021, Alıyev signed for Zira from Gabala.

Honours
Gabala
Azerbaijan Cup (1): 2018–19

References

External links
 
 

1996 births
Living people
Association football midfielders
Azerbaijani footballers
Azerbaijan international footballers
Azerbaijan under-21 international footballers
Azerbaijan youth international footballers
Azerbaijan Premier League players
Gabala FC players
Zira FK players